Tim Turner was a male rower who competed for England.

Rowing career
Turner was selected in the stroke seat and represented England, where he won a gold medal in the eights at the 1938 British Empire Games in Sydney, New South Wales, Australia.

His inclusion in the eight was controversial because he lived in Australia and was only selected in the team because he was born on England and was formerly a member of the London Rowing Club which the rest of the team belonged to. London RC member Roger Harman vacated the seat to allow Turner to compete in the crew.

References

English male rowers
Rowers at the 1938 British Empire Games
Commonwealth Games medallists in rowing
Commonwealth Games gold medallists for England
Medallists at the 1938 British Empire Games